George Robinson (25 May 1901 – 19 November 1962) was an Australian rules footballer who played with Richmond in the Victorian Football League (VFL).

Notes

External links 

1901 births
1962 deaths
Australian rules footballers from Victoria (Australia)
Richmond Football Club players
Nathalia Football Club players